Verena Sailer (born 16 October 1985 in Illertissen) is a retired German sprinter, who specialised in the 100 metres. Her personal best time is 11.02 seconds, achieved in August 2013. She won the gold medal at the 2010 European Athletics Championships in Barcelona. During her sporting career she was a member of MTG Mannheim.

Sailer represented Germany at the 2008 Summer Olympics in Beijing. She competed in the 4 × 100 metres relay together with Anne Möllinger, Cathleen Tschirch and Marion Wagner. In their first round heat they placed third behind Jamaica and Russia and in front of China. Their time of 43.59 seconds was the eighth time overall out of sixteen participating nations. With this result they qualified for the final, in which they sprinted to a time of 43.28 seconds, which was the fifth place. At the 2009 IAAF World Championships in Berlin, she made it to the semifinal of the 100 m and ran 11.24 seconds. She was the fourth leg of the German 4 × 100 m squad, which secured the bronze medal in a season's best time of 42.87 seconds.

At the 2012 European Athletics Championships in Helsinki, Sailer was unable to defend her European Championship title and finished 6th in the final heat of the 100 metres event with a time of 11.42 s. She then led the German 4 × 100 metres relay team of Leena Günther, Anne Cibis, and Tatjana Pinto as the final runner with a clear lead to win the title again since 1994 at the same venue.

At the 2012 Summer Olympics, she competed in the individual 100 m as well as the 4 × 100 m. Although she did not reach the individual final, the German team (Sailer, Leena Günther, Anne Cibis and Tatjana Pinto) did, finishing in 5th place.

Achievements 

†: Disqualified in the final.

References

External links 
 

1985 births
Living people
People from Illertissen
Sportspeople from Swabia (Bavaria)
German female sprinters
German national athletics champions
Athletes (track and field) at the 2008 Summer Olympics
Athletes (track and field) at the 2012 Summer Olympics
Olympic athletes of Germany
World Athletics Championships medalists
European Athletics Championships medalists
World Athletics Championships athletes for Germany
MTG Mannheim athletes
Olympic female sprinters